Robert Žbogar (born 6 March 1989 in Kranj) is a Slovenian swimmer. At the 2012 Summer Olympics, he competed in the Men's 200 metre butterfly, finishing in 24th place overall in the heats, failing to qualify for the semifinals.  He competed in the same event at 2016 Olympics.

References

Slovenian male swimmers
Sportspeople from Kranj
Living people
Olympic swimmers of Slovenia
Swimmers at the 2012 Summer Olympics
Swimmers at the 2016 Summer Olympics
Male butterfly swimmers
1989 births
Swimmers at the 2013 Mediterranean Games
Mediterranean Games competitors for Slovenia